Qurain Abu al-Bawl (also Gurain al Balbul, Gurain al Bâlbûl, Qurain Abul Bul, Qurayn Aba al Bawl, Qurayn Abā al Bawl, Tuwayyir al Hamir) is the highest point of Qatar, with an altitude of 103 metres (338 ft). It is located south of the peninsula near the border to Saudi Arabia.

Etymology
"Qurain" is interchangeable with "Qarn", the Arabic word which roughly corresponds to sandy, flat hillock. The second part of the name, romanized either as "Abu al-Bawl" or "Balboul", was chosen as the hill is thought to represent the shape of a traditional flat-shaped toy known as balboul.

See also
 Geography of Qatar
 List of elevation extremes by country

References

External links
  Qurayn Abu al Bawl - World land features database, WorldCityDB.com.
  mountain-forecast.com, Qurayn Abu al Bawl, last viewed 10. März 2012.

Hills of Qatar
Highest points of countries
Al Rayyan